Katharina Paldauf (born about 1625 in Fürstenfeld; died probably 23 September 1675), born Fondell, was the wife of the keeper of the Riegersburg Castle and the most prominent victim of the Great Witch trial of Feldbach (1673–1675). As a so-called "flower witch" in Riegersburg after her death she was known far beyond her home region.

Life
Katharina Paldauf was born about 1625. At 20, she entered the service of Elisabeth Katharina Freifrau von Galler († 1672), the owner of the Riegersburg Castle. There, she met her future husband Johann Simon Paldauf, who was employed by the "bad Liesl", as the lady of the castle was popularly known as castle keeper (administrator). The couple had at least three children: Katharina, Anna and Ferdinand.

In the spring of 1675, when Katharina was about 50 years old she was accused of having manipulated weather and participated in witch Sabbaths, arrested and incarcerated in Feldbach. Though she initially denied the accusations, after being tortured she confessed and gave the names of other people that she said participated in witch meetings. She was found guilty and sentenced to death. She was first killed and then burnt to the stake, probably on 23 September 1675.

External links 
 Katharina Paldauf (from the catalog to the Styrian Regional Exhibition 1987, German text)

1625 births
1675 deaths
17th-century Austrian people
17th-century executions
People executed by Austria
People executed for witchcraft
Witch trials in Austria